Acacia crassistipula is a shrub belonging to the genus Acacia and the subgenus Phyllodineae that is endemic to western Australia.

Description
The erect green phyllodes are asymmetric with a narrowly oblong to narrowly elliptic shape. It blooms from July to August and produces yellow flowers. The simple inflorescences occur singly in the axils with spherical to slightly obloid flower-heads that have a diameter of  densely packed with 27 to 33 golden coloured flowers. The hairy, brown, thinly coriaceous to crustaceous seed pods that form after flowering have a narrowly oblong shape and are undulate or curved.

Taxonomy
The species was first formally described by the botanist George Bentham in 1842 as a part of William Jackson Hooker's work Notes on Mimoseae, with a synopsis of species as published in the London Journal of Botany. It was reclassified as Racosperma crassistipulum by Leslie Pedley in 2003 and transferred back to genus Acacia in 2006.

Distribution
It is native to an area in the Great Southern and Wheatbelt regions of Western Australia where it grows in lateritic gravelly sandy soils. The shrub has a discontinuous distribution and is mostly situated from around Mogumber in the north down to around York in the south. Other smaller populations are also found around further south between Borden, Tambellup and Nyabing as a part of open heathland and open Eucalyptus wandoo woodland communities.

See also
List of Acacia species

References

crassistipula
Acacias of Western Australia
Plants described in 1842
Taxa named by George Bentham